Solo Guitar is the 13th studio album by Earl Klugh released in 1989.

Track listing 
"It's Only a Paper Moon" - 2:15
"So Many Stars" - 3:13
"I'm Confessin' (That I Love You)" - 2:23
"If I Only Had a Brain" - 2:13
"Emily" - 2:43
"Love Is Here to Stay" - 2:42
"Someday My Prince Will Come" - 2:03
"Any Old Time of Day" - 3:30
"Once upon a Summertime" - 3:06
"Embraceable You" - 3:50
"I'm All Smiles" - 2:41
"You Make Me Feel So Young" - 3:01
"Autumn Leaves" - 2:34
"The Way You Look Tonight" - 2:36

Charts

References 

1989 albums
Earl Klugh albums
Warner Records albums